The 561st Weapons Squadron is a United States Air Force squadron assigned to the USAF Weapons School at Nellis Air Force Base, Nevada.   The squadron was the last United States Air Force unit to fly the McDonnell F-4 Phantom II on operational missions.  The last Republic F-105 Thunderchief shot down in the Vietnam War was from the 561st.

The squadron was originally activated during World War II as the 561st Bombardment Squadron.  After training in the United States, it deployed to the European Theater of Operations, where it participated in the strategic bombing campaign against Germany.  The squadron was twice awarded the Distinguished Unit Citation for its combat actions.  Following V-E Day, it returned to the United States and was inactivated.  The squadron was briefly active in the reserve in the late 1940s, but does not appear to have been fully manned or equipped.

The squadron was redesignated the 561st Fighter-Bomber Squadron and activated in 1953.  It moved to Europe, but was inactivated in 1957, when it was replaced by another unit.  It was activated again as the 561st Tactical Fighter Squadron in 1962.  It conducted frequent deployments, but focused on training pilots for operations in Southeast Asia.  Elements of the squadron participated in combat there, although the squadron remained in the United States.  From 1973, it conducted Wild Weasel training.  It deployed crews and planes to Southwest Asia during Desert Storm and maintained elements there until inactivating in 1996.  It was activated in its current role in 2007.

Mission
The 561st provides information on tactical lessons learned and current tactics, techniques and procedures to ensure that training contributes to increased readiness and. It is the focal point for a process that collects, vets, disseminates, and integrates relevant and timely information and is a central source for current tactical doctrine and tactical resources.

History

World War II

Initial training and deployment
The 561st was first activated as the 561st Bombardment Squadron at Gowen Field, Idaho, one of the four original squadrons of the 388th Bombardment Group, in December 1942. The cadre that formed at Gowen moved to Wendover Field, Utah in February 1943, where the unit was fully manned and squadron training with Boeing B-17 Flying Fortress heavy bombers began. Training continued until June 1943, when it deployed to England.

Combat in Europe

The squadron assembled at RAF Knettishall, its combat station, and flew its first combat mission on 17 July, when it attacked an aircraft factory in Amsterdam.  The squadron primarily engaged in the strategic bombing campaign against Germany, attacking industrial sites, oil refineries and storage facilities, communications centers and naval targets on the European Continent.

The squadron was awarded a Distinguished Unit Citation (DUC) for attacking an aircraft factory at Regensburg, Germany, on 17 August 1943, withstanding heavy resistance to reach the target.  It was awarded a second DUC for three separate missions: an earlier attack on a tire and rubber factory in Hanover, Germany on 26 July 1943 and two missions in 1944, one against synthetic oil refineries near Brüx, Germany on 12 May and at Ruhland, Germany on 21 June. This last attack was on a shuttle bombing mission from England to Germany to Poltava, USSR, to Foggia, Italy, and back to England. Other strategic targets included aircraft factories at Brunswick, Kassel, and Reims; airfields at Paris, Berlin and in Bordeaux; naval installations at Emden, Kiel and La Pallice, chemical works in Ludwigshafen; ball bearing factories at Schweinfurt and rail marshalling yards in Bielefeld, Brussels, and Osnabruck.

The squadron was occasionally diverted from the strategic campaign to perform air support and interdiction missions.  It attacked military installations in France in early 1944 to help prepare the way for Operation Overlord, the invasion of Normandy, and on D Day hit coastal defenses, artillery batteries and transportation targets.  It attacked troop concentrations and supply depots.  In July 1944, it supported Operation Cobra at Saint Lo and the following month attacked targets in Caen.  It struck military installations and airfields near Arnhem during Operation Market Garden, the unsuccessful attempt to secure a bridgehead across the Rhine in the Netherlands.  It attacked transportation targets to support the final drive through Germany in early 1945.

Return and inactivation
The squadron flew its last combat mission in April 1945.  After V-E Day, the squadron flew missions to the Netherlands to drop food in flooded areas.  It then began redeploying to the United States.  Its aircraft left Knettishall between 9 June and 5 July 1945.  The ground echelon sailed again on the Queen Elizabeth on 5 August.  The squadron inactivated at Sioux Falls Army Air Field, South Dakota on 28 August 1945.

Air reserve
The squadron was activated in the reserves at Orchard Place Airport, Illinois on 12 June 1947 and assigned to the 338th Bombardment Group. The squadron trained under the supervision of Air Defense Command (ADC)'s 141st AAF Base Unit (Reserve Training) (later the 2471st Air Force Reserve Flying Training Center), although it does not appear that it was fully manned or equipped.

In July 1948 Continental Air Command (ConAC) assumed responsibility for managing reserve and Air National Guard units from ADC. ConAC moved the squadron to General Mitchell Field, Wisconsin in September 1948.  The 561st was inactivated when President Truman's reduced 1949 defense budget required reductions in the number of units in the Air Force, With the squadron's inactivation reserve flying operations at Mitchell ended until 1952, when the 438th Troop Carrier Wing was activated there.

Fighter operations in Europe

The squadron was redesignated the 561st Fighter-Bomber Squadron and activated at Clovis Air Force Base, New Mexico in November 1953. The squadron was equipped with North American F-86F Sabres, with a capability of carrying nuclear weapons. A year after activation, in November 1954, the squadron was transferred to United States Air Forces Europe and departed, along with other elements of the 388th Fighter-Bomber Wing, for Étain-Rouvres Air Base, France.  However, construction at Etain was not far enough advanced to permit it to accept fighter aircraft, and only the wing headquarters settled in to the base. Instead, the squadron ferried their Sabres to Hahn Air Base, Germany, arriving the following month.

Little flying was done in the squadron's first winter in Europe due to weather.  It deployed to Wheelus Air Base, Libya in April 1955, where it was able to train in gunnery and bombing for the first time since arriving in Europe.  The squadron was the last of the wing's operational units to rejoin the wing at its permanent base in France.  Starting in November 1955, the squadron provided support for Detachment 1 of the 388th Wing at Hahn, and deployed there to stand nuclear alert.  The detachment moved to Spangdahlem Air Base, Germany in February 1956.

In August 1956, the squadron began training to convert to the North American F-100 Super Sabre.  The conversion was completed by May 1957. However, the squadron flew the "Hun" for less than a year.  On 10 December 1957, the 49th Fighter-Bomber Wing moved from Japan on paper to replace the 388th Wing, The 561st was inactivated and its mission, personnel and aircraft transferred to the 7th Fighter-Bomber Squadron.

F-105 fighter operations
The squadron was redesignated the 561st Tactical Fighter Squadron and organized at McConnell Air Force Base, Kansas in October 1962 and assigned to the 388th Tactical Fighter Wing.  In February 1964, the 388th was replaced at McConnell by the 23d Tactical Fighter Wing. The 561st was equipped with the Republic F-105 Thunderchief.  The squadron conducted tactical operations and training in preparation for global deployment and deployed to Yokota Air Base, Japan in 1965.  After 1966, the squadron conducted replacement training in the F-105, conducting frequent deployments to George Air Force Base, California.

Wild Weasel operations

Wild Weasel operations became the squadron's primary mission in mid-1970, when the squadron exchanged its single seat F-105s for two seat F-105G Thunderchiefs.  In April 1972, the squadron established Detachment 1 at Korat Royal Thai Air Force Base, Thailand and flew combat Wild Weasel missions. The detachment was discontinued in September, but crews and planes of the squadron continued to fly missions until late January 1973.  The squadron was awarded the Air Force Outstanding Unit Award with "V" Device and the Vietnamese Gallantry Cross with Palm for this period. A plane from the 561st was the last F-105 shot down in the Vietnam War. It was hit by a surface-to-air-missile on 16 November 1972; the crew was rescued. One of the surviving aircraft from the squadron is on display at the National Museum of the United States Air Force with the 561st Squadron's markings.

On 1 July 1973, the 561st moved to George Air Force Base and joined the 35th Tactical Fighter Wing.  At George, the squadron mission was primarily the training of Wild Weasel crews.  The squadron continued to fly the F-105G until 1980, when it began transitioning into the McDonnell F-4G Phantom II advanced Wild Weasel, completing the transition the following year.  In August 1990, the Wild Weasels deployed to Sheikh Isa Air Base, Bahrain and during Operation Desert Storm flew over 2,400 sorties logging more than 8,000 combat hours.  After the war, the squadron was inactivated on 30 June 1992.

The squadron was activated at Nellis Air Force Base as part of the 57th Operations Group on 1 February 1993. the 561st soon deployed to Incirlik Air Base in support of Operation Provide Comfort and returned to Southwest Asia at Dhahran Air Base in Saudi Arabia, supporting Operation Southern Watch and Operation Vigilant Warrior.  The 561st was also employed as an "Aggressor" squadron during RED FLAG exercises.  In 1994, the 561st became the largest fighter squadron in the United States Air Force. It maintained a continuous deployment to the Middle East until inactivating in October 1996.

Joint tactics
The squadron was redesignated the 561st Joint Tactics Squadron and activated at Nellis in May 2007 in its current role.  It was reassigned to the USAF Weapons School and renamed the 561st Weapons Squadron in July 2019.

Lineage
 Constituted as the 561st Bombardment Squadron (Heavy) on 19 December 1942
 Activated on 24 December 1942
 Redesignated 561st Bombardment Squadron, Heavy on 20 August 1943
 Inactivated on 28 August 1945
 Redesignated 561st Bombardment Squadron, Very Heavy on 5 May 1947
 Activated in the reserve on 12 June 1947
 Inactivated on 27 June 1949
 Redesignated 561st Fighter-Bomber Squadron on 5 November 1953
 Activated on 23 November 1953
 Inactivated on 10 December 1957
 Redesignated 561st Tactical Fighter Squadron and activated on 1 May 1962 (not organized)
 Organized on 1 October 1962
 Redesignated 561st Fighter Squadron on 1 November 1991
 Inactivated on 30 June 1992
 Activated on 1 February 1993
 Inactivated on 1 October 1996
 Redesignated 561st Joint Tactics Squadron on 1 May 2007
 Activated on 22 May 2007
 Redesignated 561st Weapons Squadron on 16 July 2019

Assignments
 388th Bombardment Group, 24 December 1942 – 28 August 1945
 338th Bombardment Group, 12 June 1947 – 27 June 1949
 388th Fighter-Bomber Group, 23 November 1953 – 10 December 1957 (attached to 388th Fighter-Bomber Wing after 1 July 1957)
 Tactical Air Command, 1 May 1962 (not organized)
 388th Tactical Fighter Wing, 1 October 1962
 23d Tactical Fighter Wing, 8 February 1964 (attached to 41st Air Division, 6 March – 8 July 1965)
 832d Air Division, 1 July 1972 (attached to 35th Tactical Fighter Wing)
 35th Tactical Fighter Wing, 15 July 1973
 37th Tactical Fighter Wing, 30 March 1981
 35th Tactical Fighter Wing (later 35th Fighter Wing), 5 October 1989 – 30 June 1992 (attached to 35th Tactical Fighter Wing, Provisional, 16 August 1990 – March 1991)
 57th Operations Group, 1 February 1993 – 1 October 1996
 United States Air Force Warfare Center, 22 May 2007
 57th Wing, 14 February 2010
 USAF Weapons School, 16 July 2019 – present

Stations

 Gowen Field, Idaho, 24 December 1942
 Wendover Field, Utah, c. 1 February 1943
 Sioux City Army Air Base, Iowa, 1 May – 7 June 1943
 RAF Knettishall (AAF-136), England, June 1943-c. 6 August 1945
 Sioux Falls Army Air Field, South Dakota, c. 13–28 August 1945
 Orchard Place Airport, Illinois, 12 June 1947
 General Mitchell Field, Wisconsin, 2 September 1948 – 27 June 1949
 Clovis Air Force Base, New Mexico, 23 November 1953 – 28 November 1954
 Hahn Air Base, Germany, 12 December 1954
 Étain-Rouvres Air Base, France, 1 December 1955 – 10 December 1957

 McConnell Air Force Base, Kansas, 1 October 1962
 Deployed to Yokota Air Base, Japan, 6 March – 8 July 1965. deployed to George Air Force Base, California, 16–26 May 1966, 23 September – 17 October 1966, 17 February – 9 March 1967, 4–18 August 1967, 23 January – 8 February 1968, 18 June – 3 July 1968, 15–27 November 1968, 6–21 May 1969, and 12 November-c. 2 December 1969
 George Air Force Base, California, 1 July 1973 – 30 June 1992
 Deployed at: Sheik Isa Air Base, Bahrain, 16 August 1990 – March 1991
 Nellis Air Force Base, Nevada, 1 February 1993 – 1 October 1996
 Nellis Air Force Base, Nevada, 22 May 2007 – present

Aircraft
 Boeing B-17 Flying Fortress, 1943–1945
 North American F-86 Sabre, 1954–1956
 North American F-100 Super Sabre, 1957
 Republic F-105 Thunderchief, 1964–1980
 McDonnell F-4 Phantom II, 1981–1992, 1993–1996

Awards and campaigns

See also

 Wild Weasel
 List of United States Air Force squadrons
 List of Wings of the United States Air Force
 B-17 Flying Fortress units of the United States Army Air Forces
 List of F-86 Sabre units
 List of F-100 units of the United States Air Force 
 List of F-105 units of the United States Air Force 
 List of F-4 Phantom II operators

References

Notes
 Explanatory notes

 Citations

Bibliography

 
  (link to Google Books extract)

External links

 The 561st
 Society of Wild Weasels

Squadrons of the United States Air Force
Military units and formations in Nevada